The Church of Christ in China Tam Lee Lai Fun Memorial Secondary School (中華基督教會譚李麗芬紀念中學), is a Christian secondary school in Tuen Mun of Hong Kong near Light Rail Affluence stop. Located at San Wo Lane, the school is founded by The Hong Kong Council of the Church of Christ in China. The school hosts a student body of approximately 830, aged 11 to 20, with 63 teachers.

Visions
Inspire one's potential and establish one's goal in life by adhering God's spirit.
Train themselves to distinguish between right and wrong and ability to have self-esteem and self-respect.
Build up their relationship between others and enrich themselves with lifelong learning.
Become a good citizen by contributing to the society.

School facilities
 Air-Conditioned fixed classrooms
 Liberal Studies Learning Centre
 Computer Laboratories
 Information Technology Rooms
 Multimedia Learning Centre
 Computer Rooms
 Chemistry Labs
 Physics Rooms
 Biology Rooms
 Parents Resource Centre
 Environment Resource Centre
 Gyms
 Wall-climbing facilities
 Greenhouse
 Organic Farming Laboratories
 Observatory Station
 Simulated Military Training Field
 Eco Lake

Courses provided
 Junior Classes (Form 1-3)
Chinese
English Language
Mathematics
Liberal Studies
History
General Computing
General Science
Design and Technology
Visualized communications
Music
Physical Education
Religion(Christian)
Business, Accounting and Financial Studies

 Senior Classes (Form 4-6)
Chinese
English Language
Mathematics
Liberal Studies
Integrated Science(Biology+Chemistry)
Integrated Science(Biology+Physics)
Chemistry
Physics
Biology
Economy
Business, Accounting and Financial Studies
Information and Communication Technology
Travel and Hospitality
Physical Education(Elective)
Visual Arts
Religion(Christian)
Physical Education

References

Educational institutions established in 1990
Hong Kong Council of the Church of Christ in China
Tuen Mun
Protestant secondary schools in Hong Kong
1990 establishments in Hong Kong